Novak Djokovic defeated the two-time defending champion Andy Murray in the final, 5–7, 7–6(13–11), 6–3 to win the singles tennis title at the 2012 Shanghai Masters. Djokovic saved five championship points en route to the title (all in the second set), and ended Murray's perfect 12–0 record at the event. The final was voted as the best ATP World Tour match of the 2012 season.

Seeds
The top eight seeds receive a bye into the second round.

Draw

Finals

Top half

Section 1

Section 2

Bottom half

Section 3

Section 4

Qualifying

Seeds

Qualifiers

Draw

First qualifier

Second qualifier

Third qualifier

Fourth qualifier

Fifth qualifier

Sixth qualifier

Seventh qualifier

References

 Main Draw
 Qualifying Draw

Shanghai Rolex Masters - Singles
2012 Shanghai Rolex Masters